Brainchild is an American educational streaming television series produced by Pharrell Williams. Its producers previously created National Geographic's Brain Games. The series was released on Netflix on November 1, 2018.

Premise
Brainchild is an educational series targeted toward a young audience that conducts various scientific experiments. Experiment topics include dreams, emotions, superheroes, motivation, and gravity.

Cast
 Sahana Srinivasan - Host
 Alie Ward - Science Friend
 Gary T. Carlin - Various voices
 Ben Seidman as himself

Release
The first season was released on November 1, 2018 on Netflix.

References

External links
 
 
 

2018 American television series debuts
2010s American children's television series
2010s American documentary television series
American children's education television series
English-language Netflix original programming
Netflix children's programming